Svend Møllnitz (7 July 1897 – 18 September 1988) was a Danish footballer. He played in one match for the Denmark national football team in 1927.

References

External links
 

1897 births
1988 deaths
Danish men's footballers
Denmark international footballers
Place of birth missing
Association footballers not categorized by position